Canyon railway station is located in the community of Canyon in Unorganized Kenora District in northwestern Ontario, Canada. The railway station lies on the Canadian National Railway transcontinental main line, between Favel to the west and McIntosh to the east, and is in use by Via Rail as a stop for transcontinental Canadian trains.

References

External links
 Canyon railway station

Via Rail stations in Ontario
Railway stations in Kenora District
Canadian National Railway stations in Ontario